The Care Standards Act 2000 (CSA) is an Act of the Parliament of the United Kingdom which provides for the administration of a variety of care institutions, including children's homes, independent hospitals, nursing homes and residential care homes.

The CSA, which was enacted in April 2002, replaces the Registered Homes Act 1984 and parts of the Children Act 1989, which pertain to the care or the accommodation of children.

The aim of the legislation is to reform the law relating to the inspection and regulation of various care institutions.

External links
Highlights on updated version of the Care Standards Act

UK Legislation 

United Kingdom Acts of Parliament 2000
Social care in the United Kingdom